Silje Vige (born 24 May 1976, in Jørpeland) is a Norwegian singer from Jørpeland outside Stavanger.

Vige won the Melodi Grand Prix with an ethno-ballad written by her father. The win allowed her to compete as Norway's entry in the 1993 Eurovision Song Contest with "Alle mine tankar" ("All my thoughts"). She finished in fifth place among the 25 participants.

Discography
 Alle mine tankar (Single, 1993)
 Alle mine tankar (Album, 1994)

References

External links
 

1976 births
Living people
Eurovision Song Contest entrants of 1993
Eurovision Song Contest entrants for Norway
Melodi Grand Prix contestants
Melodi Grand Prix winners
People from Strand, Norway
People from Rogaland
20th-century Norwegian educators
21st-century Norwegian educators
20th-century Norwegian women singers
20th-century Norwegian singers
21st-century Norwegian women singers
21st-century Norwegian singers